The events of 1979 in anime.

Accolades
Ōfuji Noburō Award: The Castle of Cagliostro

Releases

See also
1979 in animation

External links 
Japanese animated works of the year, listed in the IMDb

Anime
Anime
Years in anime